Zac Drayson (born 14 January 1983) is an Australian actor.

Career
He is best known for the role of Will Smith, one of Irene Roberts' (Lynne McGranger) many foster children in the soap opera Home and Away. He was a regular from 1998–2002 and made occasional guest appearances from 2003 to 2005.

His character, Will, left Summer Bay after marrying the mother of his child Lily, Gypsy Nash (Kimberley Cooper). Will later returned to the Bay on a number of occasions to see his friends and family. His first being when brother Nick (Chris Egan) ran away as he was in trouble, he later returned after drifting apart from Gypsy. On this occasion Will hoped to win back his ex-girlfriend Dani Sutherland (Tammin Sursok) but she turned him down and told him to repair his rocky marriage. He also returned for his younger sister Hayley Lawson's (Bec Hewitt) wedding to Noah (Beau Brady). Drayson's more recent stints as Will have seen his character adopt Rachel McGregor, and the 4000th episode of the soap.

He also appeared in an episode of All Saints in 2006. He played a young boy stuck on a bus that had crashed with no hope of survival.

Drayson returned to Home and Away from 14 October 2010 to 7 February 2011.

References

External links
 

1983 births
Australian male television actors
Place of birth missing (living people)
Living people